TSLAQ (pronounced "Tesla Q") is a loose, international collective of largely anonymous short-sellers, skeptics, and researchers who openly criticize Tesla, Inc. and its CEO Elon Musk. The group primarily organizes on Twitter, often using the $TSLAQ cashtag, and Reddit to coordinate efforts and share news, opinions, and analysis about the company and its stock. Edward Niedermeyer, in his book Ludicrous: The Unvarnished Story of Tesla Motors (2019), establishes the catalyst for the formation of TSLAQ in July 2018 to be the doxxing by a Twitter user of Lawrence Fossi, a Seeking Alpha writer and Tesla short seller who uses the pseudonym Montana Skeptic.

TSLAQ highlights what it claims to be a variety of dangerous, deceptive, unlawful and fraudulent business practices by Tesla. On occasion, TSLAQ has exchanged hostilities with Tesla fans over social media. An online group, TSLAQ's activities at times include taking aerial photography and visiting parking lots used by Tesla for storage.

Motivations 

According to the Los Angeles Times in 2019, TSLAQ members believe Tesla is a fraudulent company and its stock would eventually crash, while also specifically claiming that Tesla was experiencing a "demand cliff" for its products and has had to regularly distort its sales numbers. Their self-reported main goal  was to "change the mind of Tesla stock bulls and the media." Tesla was the most shorted stock in the U.S. in December 2020, with over $34.5 billion in shorted share value at its peak. Business Insider described TSLAQ member activity in 2019 as consisting of "exchang[ing] research, news articles, and sometimes outlandish conspiracy theories about the company" and that members were "betting on the company's death and have found much success in irritating the billionaire executive."

Criticizing Tesla's practices 
Tesla under Musk's leadership has been involved in a number of lawsuits and controversies, including investigations by the U.S. Securities and Exchange Commission (SEC) and the Department of Justice. News of such investigations and subsequent litigation, the alleged fraud and insider-dealing in connection with Tesla's acquisition of SolarCity in 2016, are major organizing points for TSLAQ members. Notably, Elon Musk revealed a "solar roof" shingle in October 2016 that later turned out to be fake, as originally speculated by TESLAcharts. The group has also raised questions about accounting irregularities related to warranty reserves, accounts receivables, and regulatory credits.

TSLAQ has highlighted a California judge's ruling in 2019 that Tesla had violated labor laws by unfairly disciplining employees who engaged in pro-union activity. According to TSLAQ member Paul91701736, Tesla has frequently failed to achieve overly optimistic production projections. Following Musk's statement that "Tesla does not need to ever raise another funding round" in 2012, TSLAQ and others argue Tesla has had a total negative cash flow of over $8 billion and subsequently raised over $18 billion in additional debt and equity via subsidies and other means. Musk also planned to build a fully automated factory for mass production of the Tesla Model 3, describing the factory as an "unstoppable alien dreadnought ... [the] machine that builds the machine." However, footage produced by a TSLAQ member of activity at the Fremont factory revealed that cars were largely being built by hand.

Hothi defamation lawsuit 
In April 2019, Tesla filed a lawsuit and a request for a restraining order against TSLAQ member Randeep Hothi, also known as skabooshka. The allegations spanned two episodes:

 In February 2019, Mr. Hothi was found sitting in his car in the Tesla Fremont Factory parking lot. Security ordered him to leave at which point Tesla alleged he exited at high speed and nearly struck an employee.
 In a separate instance in April 2019, Mr. Hothi spotted a Tesla on the highway fitted with numerous camera systems and personnel in the car and he proceeded to film the vehicle believing it to be demonstrating and filming Tesla's Autopilot capabilities. Tesla alleged that he drove erratically and dangerously.

In response to the allegations, TSLAQ members led by Lawrence Fossi ran a GoFundMe campaign that raised more than $100,000 for Hothi's defense fund. Tesla eventually dropped the lawsuit and the request for a temporary restraining order against Hothi after they refused to produce footage from within the test car on the grounds it "risked the safety and privacy of the employees involved in the case". After reviewing the surveillance camera footage of Tesla parking lot from the February date in question, Fremont police declined to press charges.

In August 2020, Hothi sued Elon Musk for defamation over his accusations, in an email exchange with PlainSite's owner Aaron Greenspan, that Hothi had almost killed Tesla employees. The presiding judge rejected Musk's motion to strike the lawsuit in January 2021, therefore allowing for the trial to move forward and Musk's later attempt on appeal at an anti-SLAPP judgment were repudiated.

References

Further reading

External links 
 $TSLAQ timeline on Twitter
 Tesla Deaths
 r/EnoughMuskSpam on Reddit

Social movements
Internet-based activism
Criticisms of companies
Tesla, Inc.
Skeptic organizations
Elon Musk